Palads Teatret (the Palads Cinema), also known simply as the Palads, is a cinema operated by Nordisk Film in Copenhagen, Denmark. It offers a wide selection of films in its 17 auditoriums, more than in any other Danish cinema.

History
 
The Palads was established in Copenhagen's former central railway station on Axeltorv which had ceased operations in 1911 following the construction of a new station. After major reconstruction work, the cinema opened on 18 October 1912. With some 3,000 seats and a 30-man orchestra, it was Scandinavia's largest entertainment centre. The former station building was completely demolished in 1917, providing space for today's building designed by Andreas Clemmensen and Johan Nielsen. Kai Nielsen's sculpture of Ursus and the Bull was positioned on the roof from the beginning but was not gilded until 1949.

In the mid-1970s, the cinema suffered from diminishing audiences threatening its viability. Drawing on the experience of the Marignan Concorde cinema in Paris which had been divided up into six auditoriums, the Palads was restructured into 12 auditoriums in 1978. Despite general scepticism, the alterations proved a huge success attracting 57,921 visitors in just one week. In September 1979, a further five auditoriums were opened in the basement. The interior was redecorated throughout in blue and grey with red seating.

In 1989, the outside of the building was painted in vivid pastel colours by Poul Gernes, livening up its appearance, especially when illuminated in the evening.

Recent developments
Today the cinema consists of 17 auditoriums with a total of 2,600 seats. In 2010, the foyer was completely renovated, reflecting modern trends in design and technology. The venue is also used for a variety of other events such as sports functions and ballet performances. The cinema currently offers the widest selection of films in Denmark, covering the interests of all age groups. It is fitted with the latest technical equipment including Digital 3D.

In popular culture
The building has been used as a location in the films Man elsker kun een gang (1945) and Olsen-banden går amok (1973).

References

External links

 

Palads Teatret
Neoclassical architecture in Copenhagen
Theatres completed in 1918
Cinemas in Copenhagen
1918 establishments in Denmark
Andreas Clemmensen buildings